Michael Dion Dumas (born March 18, 1969 in Grand Rapids, Michigan, a 1987 graduate of Lowell High School, is a former American football player who was selected by the Houston Oilers in the 2nd round (28th overall) of the 1991 NFL Draft. A 6'0", 202-lb. safety from the Indiana University, Dumas played in eight NFL seasons from 1991–1992 and from 1994-2000.

1969 births
Living people
American football safeties
Indiana Hoosiers football players
Houston Oilers players
Buffalo Bills players
Jacksonville Jaguars players
San Diego Chargers players
Miami Dolphins coaches
Players of American football from Grand Rapids, Michigan